Barbosa is a town and municipality in Antioquia Department, Colombia. Situated 39 km from Medellín's downtown, it is one of the municipalities of The Metropolitan Area of the Aburrá Valley. It is known as the Gateway to the Northeast, famous for its lakes and streams. A traditional Pineapple Festival is held there in December. The Train Festival takes place in August in the district of El Hatillo.

References

The Metropolitan Area of the Aburrá Valley
Municipalities of Antioquia Department